Winter Sonata is a 2002 South Korean television drama series, starring Bae Yong-joon and Choi Ji-woo. It is the second part of the season-themed tetralogy Endless Love drama series directed by Yoon Seok-ho. Filming primarily took place on the resort island of Namiseom and Seoul. It aired on KBS2 from January 14 to March 19, 2002, on Mondays and Tuesdays at 21:55 (KST) for 20 episodes. It has also been adapted into an anime series and a stage musical.

Synopsis
The story begins when Joon-sang (Bae Yong-joon), the son of an eminent musician, moves to Chuncheon, a rural city in South Korea. As an extraordinarily talented student, Joon-sang is welcomed by his fellow students as well as his teachers, but remains a quiet, introverted teenager. As a result of the belief that his biological father is dead, and serious disagreements with his mother, Joon-sang believes that no one truly loves him.

On his way to school one day, Joon-sang's classmate Yoo-jin (Choi Ji-woo), while sitting next to him on the bus, falls asleep on his shoulder. After a few weeks, the two forge a close friendship. One day, Joon-sang convinces Yoo-jin to escape school together. On the way, Joon-sang soon falls in love with Yoo-jin, who opens her innocent heart to him.
One fateful day, when Joon-sang pays a visit to Yoo-jin's house, he comes across a photo in their photo album. Their love, however, is cut short after Joon-sang is badly injured in a car accident and, due to brain damage,  sustains amnesia, unable to remember anything prior to his accident.

Joon-sang's mother, yearning for Joon-sang's love and respect, has Joon-sang brainwashed by a hypnotist hoping to erase Joon-sang's memories of his painful childhood as an illegitimate child. As a result, Joon-sang's memories prior to the accident are erased. Joon-sang's mother decides to move to the United States with Joon-sang, where he can start a new life under the identity of Lee Min-hyung. His friends and teachers are told that Joon-sang is dead.

Ten years later, Min-hyung is an award-winning architect in the United States. He does not remember anything about his life in Korea. He is completely different, now an open-minded person who cares about other people. He returns to Korea and Yoo-jin sees him on the street, prompting her to put off her engagement to her childhood friend Sang-hyuk (Park Yong-ha). Little does she know that Min-hyung is dating her friend and past rival Chae-rin (Park Sol-mi). The story's plot thickens when Yoo-jin's interior design firm is awarded a project by Min-hyung's architectural firm, and has to work with Min-hyung. Yoo-jin sometimes wonders if he is her supposedly dead first love Joon-sang.

After a few months, Min-hyung also falls in love with Yoo-jin, fueling the anger of Chae-rin. Chae-rin sees Yoo-jin as a third wheel and attempts to draw 
Min-hyung's attention back to herself by lying about Yoo-jin. However, her plan is exposed when Min-hyung accidentally overhears a conversation between Chae-rin and Jin-sook.

Cast
 Bae Yong-joon as Kang Joon-sang / Lee Min-hyung
 Choi Ji-woo as Jeong Yoo-jin
 Park Yong-ha as Kim Sang-hyuk
 Park Sol-mi as Oh Chae-rin
 Lee Hye-eun as Kong Jin-sook
 Ryu Seung-soo as Kwon Yong-gook
 Kwon Hae-hyo as Kim seonbae
 Song Ok-sook as Kang Mi-hee, Joon-sang's mother
 Jung Dong-hwan as Kim Jin-woo, Sang-hyuk's father
 Kim Hae-sook as Lee Yeong-hee, Yoo-jin's mother
 Ha Ji-hye as Jeong Hee-jin, Yoo-jin's younger sister
 Jung Won-joong as Park Jong-ho, "Gargamel"
 Jang Hang-sun as Supervisor Min
 Lee Hyo-chun as Park Ji-young, Sang-hyuk's mother
 Park Hyun-sook as Lee Jeong-ah, Yoo-jin's colleague at Polaris
 Son Jong-bum as Yoo-jin's colleague at Polaris
 Yoo Yul as Radio broadcaster
 Maeng Ho-rim as Dr. Ahn
 Ha Jae-young as Jeong Hyeon-soo, Yoo-jin's father

Reception
Winter Sonata is credited with causing the second wave of the Korean Wave and extending it to Japan and the Philippines. It improved the image of South Korea among the Japanese and set fashion trends throughout East Asia. The series was a commercial success; 330,000 DVDs and 1,200,000 copies of Winter Sonata novelizations were sold. The series yielded more than  when taking into account the profit it contributed to tourism. The number of visitors to the island of Namiseom (where the series was shot) grew from 250,000 to over 650,000 after the series was aired. A statue of the main characters can also be found on the island at the spot where they first kissed.

The series shot actor Bae Yong-joon into stardom in Asia, and he became especially popular among middle-aged Japanese women. When he first visited Japan in 2004, more than 3,000 women guarded by 350 policemen gathered at the airport to welcome him. Junichiro Koizumi, the Japanese prime minister at the time, was quoted saying that Bae was more popular in Japan than himself.

The series was also aired in the Philippines in 2003, via GMA Network's primetime block under the title Endless Love II: Winter Sonata and one of the highest rated shows at that time. As a result, it also brought the Korean Wave to the Philippines. Just like in Japan, Bae Yong-joon became popular among middle-aged women.

The series was a success in Asia and the America as well.

Ratings
In this table,  represent the lowest ratings and  represent the highest ratings.

Original soundtrack

In addition, "Moment" performed by Ryu and available on his album Ryu 2 is included on some bootleg versions of the Winter Sonata soundtrack.

International broadcast
The drama first aired in Japan on NHK in 2004; it was dubbed in Japanese and edited into 60-minute episodes. The final episode (which aired on August 23, 2004) recorded ratings of 20.6% in Kanto, 22.5% in Nagoya, and 23.8% in the Kansai regions. The series as a whole had an average viewership in the 14% to 15% range. Due to overwhelming demand from viewers to watch the series in its original format, it was re-aired on NHK's satellite channel BS2 unedited (in its original Korean audio, with Japanese subtitles), beginning December 20, 2004.

It was the first Korean drama that ushered in the Korean Wave in Malaysia, when it aired in 2002 on TV3 dubbed in Mandarin with Malay subtitles. PMP Entertainment later released the drama in VCD and DVD format under the Bahasa title, Kisah Cinta Musim Salju (meaning "Winter Love Story"). A Malay cover version of the theme song was released with the title "Sonata Musim Salju" (meaning "Winter's Sonata").

The drama aired in Nepal on Kantipur Television Network in the mid-2000s dubbed in Nepali. The drama triggered the Korean Wave in the country and its lead star Bae Yong-joon became very popular amongst women in the country.

In 2006, pan-Asian American network AZN Television bought the rights to air Winter Sonata in a 24-hour marathon with other Korean dramas.

In Asia, the drama is available to stream via Iflix with English, Indonesian, Malay, Simplified Mandarin, Sinhalese, Vietnamese and Burmese subtitles.

Anime
An anime adaptation of Winter Sonata premiered on Japan's SKY PerfecTV! on October 17, 2009, consisting of 26 episodes subtitled in Japanese and English. Directed by Ahn Jae-hoon and written by Kim Hyeong-wan, the program featured 23 members of the original Korean cast voicing the characters, including Bae and Choi who reprised their roles. The role of "Sang-hyuk", originally played by Park Yong-ha, was voiced by singer Kang Yo-hwan and "Chae-rin" was dubbed by newcomer Lee Se-na in place of Park Sol-mi. During October 2011, Animax Asia aired the anime in Korean audio and English subtitles across South and Southeast Asia. In 2019, Allen's Television Network revived the anime with Tagalog subtitles in the Philippines. Allen Cañada revived the theme song of Di Ko Na Kaya by Faith Cuneta.

Voice cast

Korean version
 Bae Yong-joon as Kang Joon-sang / Lee Min-hyung
 Choi Ji-woo as Jeong Yoo-jin
 Kang Yo-hwan as Kim Sang-hyuk
 Lee Se-na as Oh Chae-rin
 Ryu Seung-soo as Kwon Yong-gook
 Seon Jeon-hui as Kong Jin-sook, Catalina and Marianne
 Bae Han-seon as Kim Jin-woo (Sang-hyuk's father)
 So Hye-jyeon as Kang Mi-hee (Joon-sang's mother) and Anne
 Yoon So-ra as Kim Yeong-hee (Yoo-jin's mother) and Mother superior
 Lee Young-yoo as Jeong Hee-jin (Yoo-jin's younger sister)
 Lee Jang-won as Park Jong-ho (teacher)
 Choi Seon-woo as Park Ji-young (Sang-hyuk's mother)
 Min-ji as Lee Jeong-ah
 Park Yeong-jae as Hang Seung-ryong and DJ (Sang-hyuk's colleague)
 Kim Chang as Kim Hyo-sook (Min-hyung's seonbae) and Jeong Hyeon-soo (Yoo-jin's father)
 Kim Gyu-sik as Dr. Ahn
 Seo-yeong as Jane
 Cho Gyun-joon as Manager Kim (Mi-hee's manager)
 Im Chae-hong as Claude
 Nam Do-hyeong as Louis
 Hong Seong-min as Chang
 Kim In-jeong as Manufacturing manager

Japanese version
 Masato Hagiwara as Kang Joon-sang / Lee Min-hyung
 Misato Tanaka as Jeong Yoo-jin
 Kazuma Horie as Kim Sang-hyuk
 Sayaka Kinoshita as Oh Chae-rin
 Fuminori Komatsu as Kwon Yong-gook
 Makoto Tsumura as Kong Jin-sook
 Mitsuru Takakuwa as Kim Jin-woo, Sang-hyuk's father
 Chika Mizuno as Kang Mi-hee, Joon-sang's mother
 Kaoru Katakai as Kim Yeong-hee, Yoo-jin's mother
 Michiko Komatsu as Jeong Hee-jin, Yoo-jin's younger sister
 Binbin Takaoka as Park Jong-ho, teacher
 Kikue Umimoto as Park Ji-young, Sang-hyuk's mother
 Tatsuya Kamijo as Radio DJ
 Aki Yasunaga as Lee Jeong-ah
 Seiro Ogino as Kim Hyo-sook, Min-hyung's seonbae
 Yasuhiro Mamiya as Dr. Ahn
 Kumi Tanaka as Jane
 Katsunori Kobayashi as Manager Kim, Mi-hee's manager
 Kenji Sugimura as Claude
 Ryo Agawa as Anne
 Yūto Suzuki as Louis
 Masanori Machida as Chang
 Koki Yamada as Manufacturing manager
 Kanako Hirano as Catalina
 Sayuri Sadaoka as Mother superior
 Rinko Hayashi as Marianne
 Keiichi Nakagawa as Jeong Hyeon-soo, Yoo-jin's father

Episode list

Soundtrack

Version 1
最初から今まで (From the Beginning Until Now) - instrumental 2009
サラハムニダ:初めて2 (Sarahamnida:First Time 2)
たった一歩だけでも (Only One Step Alone)
いつでもただ君だけを (Forever for Her) - Lee Se-jun (Ending)
聞きなれない声 (Not Used To Hearing Voice)
凍りついた視線 (Frozen Eye)
To My Dearest 
サラハムニダ:初めて2 (New Age ver.) (Sarahamnida:First Time 2 New Age ver.)
逢いたい (I Miss You) - Yoo Hae-joon
Mystery Episodes
氷の湖 (Ice Lake)
RUN
ソナタ(恋歌) - Kang Yo-hwan
最初から今まで (From the Beginning Until Now) - Ryu (Opening)

Version 2
雪の森 (Snow Wood)
サラハムニダ:初めて2 (Humming ver.) (Sarahamnida:First Time 2 Humming ver.)
届かない想い (Feelings Do Not Receive) - Kang Yo-hwan
真冬の散歩道 (Winter Walking Road)
記憶と願い (Memory and Wish)
踊らないオルゴール (Music Box Do Not Dance)
サラハムニダ:初めて2 (Clarinet ver.) (Sarahamnida:First Time 2 Clarinet ver.)
Polaris
思い出づくり (Making Memory)
Invisible Love
サラハムニダ:初めて2 (Classic ver.) (Sarahamnida:First Time 2 Classic ver.)
ソナタ(恋歌)(Strings Inst ver.) (Sonata Strings Inst ver.) 
君と永遠に (With You Forever) - Shin Min-chul (T-Max)
Believe You - Yoonji

Documentary cast (episode 26)
 Bae Yong-joon as Kang Joon-sang
 Choi Ji-woo as Jeong Yoo-jin
 Kang Yo-hwan as Kim Sang-hyuk
 Lee Se-na as Oh Chae-rin
 Ryu Seung-soo as Kwon Yong-gook
 Seon Jeon-hui as Kong Jin-sook

Musical theatre
Winter Sonata marked its 10th year milestone with a staging of a new musical adaptation that ran from September 27, 2011 to March 18, 2012. Yoon Seok-ho was the producer and art director, with stage direction by Yoo Hee-sung (Mozart!, Pimagol Love Song) and musical score by Oh Eun-hee (Dae Jang Geum, Singin' in the Rain). The leading role of Yoo-jin was portrayed by musical actress Choi Soo-jin.

The Winter Sonata musical first premiered in 2006 in several cities in Japan, including Sapporo, Tokyo and Osaka, and popular crossover tenor Im Tae-kyung drew crowds. It also completed a run in Busan and Seoul, from late 2010 to early 2011, with stage direction by Im Do-wan (Woyzeck) and musical score by Lee Ji-soo.

Cast

2006
 Im Tae-kyung and Lee Sang-hyeon as Kang Joon-sang / Lee Min-hyung
 Park Hong-joo and Im Kang-hee as Jeong Yoo-jin
 Lee Pil-sung as Kim Sang-hyuk
 Jiny as Oh Chae-rin
 Lee Jin-kyu as Kwon Yong-gook
 Kim Gyung-hwa as Kong Jin-sook
 Shin Bok-ja as Kang Mi-hee, Joon-sang's mother
 Yang Joon-mo as Spirit
 Nam Moon-chul as Dr. Oh, Chae-rin's father

2011
 Kim Tae-han as Kang Joon-sang / Lee Min-hyung
 Park Woo-ne and Choi Soo-jin as Jeong Yoo-jin
 Jeong Jae-hong and Kim Gyeong-soo as Kim Sang-hyuk

Soundtrack

2006

Manga
A Japanese comic has also been published of this story, using photos of the series as covers.

Video games
Two pachinko simulation games called Pachitte Chonmage Tatsujin 10: Pachinko Fuyu no Sonata and Pachitte Chonmage Tatsujin 15: Pachinko Fuyu no Sonata 2 were made by Hack Berry and released on January 25, 2007 and December 25, 2008, respectively and for the PlayStation 2.

A Nintendo DSi enhanced title, called Fuyu no Sonata DS was released in Japan by D3Publisher on December 17, 2009.

In popular culture
In episode 5 of Da Capo II'''s first season (aired October 29, 2007), two main characters go to a movie called Fuyu no Anata (冬のアナタ), which is clearly Fuyu no Sonata (both share the same font and characters). One of the Fuyu no Anata posters visible in the Da Capo anime episode looks exactly like the first Fuyu no Sonata manga cover. The Japanese anime Kaguya-sama: Love Is War has a soundtrack adapted from one of the soundtracks by the Korean drama.

In the Family Guy episode Candy, Quahog Marshmallow, Peter, Cleveland and Joe become obsessed with a Korean drama called Winter Summer, a parody of Winter Sonata''.

Awards and nominations

References

External links

 Winter Sonata official KBS website 
 Winter Sonata the Anime official website
 Winter Sonata overview 
 
 
 Winter Sonata filming locations at Korea Tourism Organization
 

2002 South Korean television series debuts
2002 South Korean television series endings
2009 anime television series debuts
AZN Television original programming
Chuncheon
Korean Broadcasting System television dramas
Korean-language television shows
South Korean melodrama television series
South Korean romance television series
Television series by Pan Entertainment